Duravino is a rural locality (a village) in Podlesnoye Rural Settlement, Vologodsky District, Vologda Oblast, Russia. The population was 9 as of 2002.

Geography 
The distance to Vologda is 27 km, to Ogarkovo is 14 km. Pogorelka, Melnikovo, Vinnikovo, Semyonovskoye, Kostino are the nearest rural localities.

References 

Rural localities in Vologodsky District